No Home Movie is a French-Belgian 2015 documentary film directed by Chantal Akerman, focusing on conversations between the filmmaker and her mother just months before her mother's death. The film premiered at the Locarno Film Festival on 10 August 2015. It is Akerman's last film.

Synopsis
The documentary consists of conversations in person and over Skype between Akerman and her mother, Natalia, who was a survivor of Auschwitz. Halfway through the film, Akerman cuts to a succession of traveling shots of a desert, which "cleave(s) the movie in two."

Production
Filming ran several months. Her mother died shortly after filming ended, at the age of 86, in April 2014. Akerman whittled down around forty hours' worth of footage to 115 minutes; she used small handheld cameras and her BlackBerry to film. "I think if I knew I was going to do this, I wouldn’t have dared to do it," she said. Akerman died on 5 October 2015 in Paris. Le Monde reported that she committed suicide.

Release
The film premiered in the United States at the New York Film Festival on 7 October 2015, where it was described as "an extremely intimate film but also one of great formal precision and beauty, one of the rare works of art that is both personal and universal, and as much a masterpiece as her 1975 career-defining Jeanne Dielman, 23, quai du Commerce, 1080 Bruxelles." One scene, in particular, where the two "sit at the kitchen table, eating potatoes that Ms. Akerman has prepared, telling her mother that even she, the peripatetic artist, has mastered a few domestic skills" is, one New York Times reviewer suggested, "a reference to a memorable potato-peeling scene" from Jeanne.

References

External links
 
 Profile and trailer at the Toronto International Film Festival

2015 films
Belgian documentary films
Documentary films about women
Documentary films about the Holocaust
Films directed by Chantal Akerman
French documentary films
2010s French-language films
2010s English-language films
Films shot in Brussels
Films shot in Israel
English-language Belgian films
English-language French films
French-language Belgian films
2010s French films